The 1998 Cheltenham Gold Cup was a horse race which took place at Cheltenham on Thursday 19 March 1998. It was the 71st running of the Cheltenham Gold Cup, and it was won by Cool Dawn. The winner was ridden by Andrew Thornton and trained by Robert Alner. The pre-race favourite Dorans Pride finished third.

Cool Dawn's victory in the Gold Cup was the highlight of a progressive career, in which he had initially competed in minor point-to-point races and hunter chases.

Race details
 Sponsor: Tote
 Winner's prize money: £148,962.00
 Going: Good
 Number of runners: 17
 Winner's time: 6m 39.5s

Full result

* The distances between the horses are shown in lengths or shorter. hd = head; PU = pulled-up; CO = carried out.† Trainers are based in Great Britain unless indicated.

Winner's details
Further details of the winner, Cool Dawn:

 Foaled: May 11, 1988, in Ireland
 Sire: Over the River; Dam: Aran Tour (Arapaho)
 Owner: Dido Harding
 Breeder: John C. McCarthy

References
 
 sportinglife.com
 independent.co.uk – "Cheltenham awakes to a Dawn raid" – March 20, 1998.

Cheltenham Gold Cup
 1998
Cheltenham Gold Cup
Cheltenham Gold Cup
1990s in Gloucestershire